Kyle Wachholtz (born May 17, 1972) is a former American football quarterback and tight end. He was a 7th round pick by the Green Bay Packers in the 1996 NFL Draft. Wachholtz won Super Bowl XXXI with the Packers against the New England Patriots. He played college football at USC.

College career 
Attending USC, Wachholtz recorded 13 career touchdown passes against 4 interceptions, he had a college QBR of 139.2. After being academically ineligible to play at points of his career, Wachholtz split time with Brad Otton as a senior. Wachholtz was the more physical quarterback of the two. However, Wachholtz did not play a single snap in the 1996 Rose Bowl.

Professional career 
Wachholtz was drafted by the Green Bay Packers in the 1996 NFL Draft (7th round, 240th overall). He was cut by the Packers in 1996 final cuts.  On the practice squad later that year, he was converted to a tight end by the Packers. He was promoted to the active roster for Super Bowl XXXI. After a back injury while playing on the practice squad in 1997, he was cut by the Packers in mid-1998. He then tried to play with the Barcelona Dragons of NFL Europe, but failed his physical.

Post-career life 
Wachholtz re-enrolled at USC after ending his playing career. Since then, he has had a variety of jobs, most notably in online mortgaging.

References

External links
Stats from NFL.com

1972 births
Living people
People from Norco, California
Sportspeople from Riverside County, California
American football quarterbacks
American football tight ends
USC Trojans football players
Green Bay Packers players
Players of American football from California